These are the statistics for the UEFA Euro 2012, which took place in Poland and Ukraine.

Goalscorers

Assists

Scoring

Sources: Opta Sports, UEFA

Attendance
Overall attendance: 1,440,896
Average attendance per match: 
Highest attendance: 64,640 – Sweden (2–3) England
Lowest attendance: 31,840 – Denmark (2–3) Portugal

Wins and losses

Discipline
Sanctions against foul play at Euro 2012 were in the first instance the responsibility of the referee, but when if he deemed it necessary to give a caution, or dismiss a player, UEFA kept a record and may have enforced a suspension. UEFA's disciplinary committee had the ability to penalize players for offenses unpunished by the referee.

Overview

Red cards
A player receiving a red card was automatically suspended for the next match.  A longer suspension was possible if the UEFA disciplinary committee had judged the offence as warranting it. In keeping with the FIFA Disciplinary Code (FDC) and UEFA Disciplinary Regulations (UDR), UEFA did not allow for appeals of red cards except in the case of mistaken identity. The FDC further stipulated that if a player was sent off during his team's final Euro 2012 match, the suspension would carry over to his team's next competitive international(s), which in this case would be the qualification matches for the 2014 FIFA World Cup.

Any player who was suspended due to a red card that was earned in Euro 2012 qualifying was required to serve the balance of any suspension unserved by the end of qualifying either in the Euro 2012 finals (for any player on a team that qualified, whether he was selected to the final squad or not) or in World Cup qualifying (for players on teams that did not qualify).

Yellow cards
Any player receiving a single yellow card during two of the three group stage matches and the quarter-final match was suspended for the following match. A single yellow card did not carry over to the semi-finals. This meant that no player could have been suspended for final unless he was sent off in semi-final or he was serving a longer suspension for an earlier incident. Suspensions due to yellow cards did carry over to the World Cup qualifiers. Yellow cards and any related suspensions earned in the Euro 2012 qualifiers were neither counted nor enforced in the final tournament.

In the event a player was sent off for two bookable offenses, only the red card was counted for disciplinary purposes.  However, in the event a player received a direct red card after being booked in the same match, then both cards would have been counted.  If the player was already facing a suspension for two tournament bookings when he was sent off, this would have resulted in separate suspensions that would have been served consecutively.  The one match ban for the yellow cards would be served first unless the player's team was eliminated in the match in which he was sent off.  If the player's team was eliminated in the match in which he was serving his ban for the yellow cards, then the ban for the sending off would have been carried over to the World Cup qualifiers.

Additional punishment
For serious transgressions, a longer suspension may have been handed down at the discretion of the UEFA disciplinary committee. The disciplinary committee was also charged with reviewing any incidents that were missed by the officials and could have awarded administrative red cards and suspensions accordingly. However, just as appeals of red cards were not considered, the disciplinary committee was also not allowed to review transgressions that were already punished by the referee with something less than a red card. For example, if a player was booked but not sent off for a dangerous tackle, the disciplinary committee could not subsequently deem the challenge to be violent conduct and then upgrade the card to a red. However, if the same player then spat at the opponent but was still not sent off, then the referee's report would have been unlikely to mention this automatic red card offense. Video evidence of the spitting incident could then be independently reviewed.

Unlike the rules in many domestic competitions, there is no particular category of red card offense that automatically results in a multi-game suspension. In general however, extended bans were only assessed for red cards given for serious foul play, violent conduct, spitting or perhaps foul and abusive language. Also, unlike many sets of domestic rules second and subsequent red cards also did not automatically incur an extended ban, although a player's past disciplinary record (including prior competition) might have been considered by the disciplinary committee when punishing him. As a rule, only automatic red card offenses were considered for longer bans. A player who was sent off for picking up two yellow cards in the same match would not have had his automatic one-match ban extended by UEFA on account of what he did to get the second booking, because the referee deemed him as not to have committed an automatic red card offense.

If UEFA suspended a player after his team's elimination from the tournament, or for more games than the team ended up playing without him prior to the final or their elimination (whichever came first), then the remaining suspension was to be served during 2014 World Cup qualifying. For a particularly grave offense UEFA had the power to impose a lengthy ban against the offender.

Disciplinary statistics
Total number of yellow cards: 123
Average number of yellow cards per game: 3.97
Total number of red cards: 3
Average number of red cards per game: 0.10
First yellow card: Sokratis Papastathopoulos – Greece against Poland
First red card: Sokratis Papastathopoulos – Greece against Poland
Fastest yellow card from kickoff: 10 minutes and 25 seconds – Kim Källström – Sweden against Ukraine
Fastest yellow card after coming on as a substitute: 2 minutes and 51 seconds – Samuel Holmén – Sweden against France
Latest yellow card in a match without extra time: 93 minutes and 47 seconds – José Holebas – Greece against Russia
Fastest dismissal from kickoff: 44 minutes and 1 second – Sokratis Papastathopoulos – Greece against Poland
Latest dismissal in a match without extra time: 88 minutes and 40 seconds – Keith Andrews – Republic of Ireland against Italy
Latest dismissal in a match with extra time: N/A
Least time difference between two yellow cards given to the same player: 9 minutes and 51 seconds – Sokratis Papastathopoulos – Greece against Poland
Most yellow cards (team): 16 – Italy
Most red cards (team): 1 – Greece, Republic of Ireland, Poland
Fewest yellow cards (team): 4 –  Denmark, Germany
Most yellow cards (player): 3 – Keith Andrews (Republic of Ireland), Sokratis Papastathopoulos (Greece)
Most red cards (player): 1 (three players) –  Sokratis Papastathopoulos (Greece), Keith Andrews (Republic of Ireland), Wojciech Szczęsny (Poland)
Most yellow cards (match): 9 – Portugal vs Spain
Most red cards (match): 2 – Poland vs. Greece
Fewest yellow cards (match): 0 – Russia vs. Czech Republic, Denmark vs. Germany

By individual

Red cards
Three red cards were shown over the course of the tournament's thirty one matches, an average of 0.10 red cards per match.

1 red card
  Sokratis Papastathopoulos
  Keith Andrews
  Wojciech Szczęsny
Source: UEFA

Yellow cards
123 yellow cards were shown over the course of the tournament's thirty one matches, an average of 3.97 yellow cards per match.

3 yellow cards
  Sokratis Papastathopoulos
  Keith Andrews

2 yellow cards

  David Limberský
  Jérémy Ménez
  Philippe Mexès
  Jérôme Boateng
  José Holebas
  Giorgos Karagounis
  Sean St Ledger
  Mario Balotelli
  Andrea Barzagli
  Leonardo Bonucci
  Daniele De Rossi
  Christian Maggio
  Thiago Motta
  Jetro Willems
  Eugen Polanski
  Fábio Coentrão
  João Pereira
  Miguel Veloso
  Alan Dzagoev
  Xabi Alonso
  Álvaro Arbeloa
  Sergio Ramos
  Anders Svensson
  Anatoliy Tymoshchuk

1 yellow card

  Vedran Ćorluka
  Nikica Jelavić
  Niko Kranjčar
  Mario Mandžukić
  Luka Modrić
  Ivan Rakitić
  Gordon Schildenfeld
  Darijo Srna
  Ivan Strinić
  Petr Jiráček
  Daniel Kolář
  Tomáš Pekhart
  Jaroslav Plašil
  Tomáš Rosický
  Lars Jacobsen
  William Kvist
  Jakob Poulsen
  Simon Poulsen
  Ashley Cole
  Steven Gerrard
  James Milner
  Alex Oxlade-Chamberlain
  Ashley Young
  Yohan Cabaye
  Mathieu Debuchy
  Holger Badstuber
  Mats Hummels
  Kyriakos Papadopoulos
  Dimitris Salpingidis
  Georgios Samaras
  Vasilis Torosidis
  Robbie Keane
  John O'Shea
  Glenn Whelan
  Federico Balzaretti
  Gianluigi Buffon
  Giorgio Chiellini
  Riccardo Montolivo
  Mark van Bommel
  Nigel de Jong
  Robin van Persie
  Jakub Błaszczykowski
  Robert Lewandowski
  Rafał Murawski
  Damien Perquis
  Marcin Wasilewski
  Bruno Alves
  Raul Meireles
  Nani
  Pepe
  Hélder Postiga
  Cristiano Ronaldo
  Aleksandr Anyukov
  Igor Denisov
  Pavel Pogrebnyak
  Yuri Zhirkov
  Jordi Alba
  Sergio Busquets
  Javi Martínez
  Gerard Piqué
  Fernando Torres
  Rasmus Elm
  Samuel Holmén
  Kim Källström
  Olof Mellberg
  Jonas Olsson
  Yaroslav Rakitskiy
  Yevhen Selin
  Andriy Shevchenko

By referee

By team

Other sanctions

Overall statistics

Footnotes

References

External links
 UEFA Euro 2012 statistics at Union of European Football Associations

Statistics
2012